Rodrigo Rodríguez may refer to:

 Rodrigo Rodríguez (musician) (born 1978), Argentine shakuhachi musician
 Rodrigo Rodríguez (footballer, born 1990), Bolivian football midfielder
 Rodrigo Rodríguez (footballer, born 1995), Uruguayan football goalkeeper

See also
 Rodrigo Rodrigues (born 1974), Brazilian actor and filmmaker
 Rodrigo Rodrigues (TV host) (1975–2020), Brazilian journalist, TV host and musician